The women's 1500 metres speed skating competition for the 2006 Winter Olympics was held in Turin, Italy, on 22 February.

Records
Prior to this competition, the existing world and Olympic records were as follows.

No new world or Olympic records were set during the competition.

Results

References

Women's speed skating at the 2006 Winter Olympics